Sardana Aleksandrovna Trofimova (born 28 March 1988) is a Russian long-distance runner. In 2019, she competed in the women's marathon at the 2019 World Athletics Championships held in Doha, Qatar. She finished in 22nd place.

In 2014, she won the Toulouse Marathon held in Toulouse, France.

She won the Moscow Marathon in Moscow, Russia both in 2017 and in 2018.

International competitions

References

External links 
 

Living people
1988 births
People from Yakutsk
Russian female long-distance runners
Russian female marathon runners
Authorised Neutral Athletes at the World Athletics Championships
Russian Athletics Championships winners
Sportspeople from Sakha